Santiago Ignacio Vega Maidana (born 25 September 1996) is a Uruguayan footballer who plays as a forward.

Career

Rampla Juniors
A graduate of the club's youth academy, Vega made his debut for Rampla Juniors on 16 February 2019 in a 4-3 defeat to Progreso.

References

External links

1996 births
Living people
Rampla Juniors players
Uruguayan Primera División players
Uruguayan footballers
Association football forwards
Footballers from Montevideo